William A. Lydon (November 9, 1863 – October 28, 1918), with Fred C. Drews, founded the Great Lakes Dredge and Dock Company in Chicago in 1890. He died on October 28, 1918 in Chicago, Illinois.

He was Commodore of the Chicago Yacht Club, building in 1909 the 244 ton Lydonia and in 1911 contracting again with Pusey and Jones, Wilmington, Delaware for the second, 497 ton yacht Lydonia II, described as the finest yacht on the Great Lakes, acquired by the Navy 21 August 1917 and commissioned as the USS Lydonia (SP-700).

References

1863 births
1918 deaths
Place of birth missing
19th-century American businesspeople